Njabulo Manqana (born 26 August 1986 in Durban) is a South African football (soccer) midfielder who among others played for Premier Soccer League club AmaZulu.

References

1986 births
Association football midfielders
Living people
Sportspeople from Durban
South African soccer players
Lamontville Golden Arrows F.C. players
Orlando Pirates F.C. players
AmaZulu F.C. players
Royal Eagles F.C. players
South African Premier Division players
National First Division players